The 2019 Giro d'Italia is the 102nd edition of the Giro d'Italia, one of cycling's Grand Tours. The Giro began in Bologna with an individual time trial on 11 May, and Stage 11 occurred on 22 May with a stage to Novi Ligure. The race will finish in Verona on 2 June.

Stage 1

11 May 2019 – Bologna to Bologna (San Luca),  (ITT)

The first rider departed at 16:50 CEST (UTC+02:00). The route started on the Via F. Rizzoli, heading west for the first half of the course. The course then headed southwest on a  category 3 climb, with a 9.7% average gradient, to the finish line.

The stage was won by Primož Roglič who therefore became the first wearer of the maglia rosa, the pink jersey identifying the leader of the general classification. Roglič also took the lead in the points classification. Giulio Ciccone took the lead in the mountains classification and became the first wearer of the blue jersey, while Miguel Ángel López finished as the fastest young rider and became the leader of the young rider classification.

Stage 2

12 May 2019 – Bologna to Fucecchio,

Stage 3

13 May 2019 – Vinci to Orbetello, 

Elia Viviani from  crossed the line first, but was relegated by the jury due to moving from his racing line during the final sprint, therefore Fernando Gaviria, who crossed the line second, is the winner of the stage.

Stage 4

14 May 2019 – Orbetello to Frascati,

Stage 5

15 May 2019 – Frascati to Terracina, 

Tom Dumoulin, the 2017 winner and one of the race favourites, withdrew in the stage's neutral zone. He had suffered a knee injury in a crash on the previous stage.

Stage 6

16 May 2019 – Cassino to San Giovanni Rotondo,

Stage 7

17 May 2019 – Vasto to L'Aquila,

Stage 8

18 May 2019 – Tortoreto Lido to Pesaro,

Stage 9

19 May 2019 – Riccione to San Marino (San Marino),  (ITT)

Stage 10

21 May 2019 – Ravenna to Modena,

Stage 11

22 May 2019 – Carpi to Novi Ligure,

References

2019 Giro d'Italia
Giro d'Italia stages